Jalandhar Cantt Assembly constituency (Sl. No.: 37) is a Punjab Legislative Assembly constituency in 
Jalandhar district, Punjab state, India.

Members of the Legislative Assembly

Election results

2022

2017 results

References

External links
  

Assembly constituencies of Punjab, India
Jalandhar district